Giorgi Mchedlishvili (Georgian: გიორგი მჭედლიშვილი; born 18 January 1992) is a Georgian professional footballer who plays for FK Ventspils in Latvia.

Career

Mchedlishvili started his senior career with Locomotive Tbilisi. After that, he played for Merani Martvili, WIT Georgia, Dinamo Tbilisi, Guria Lanchkhuti, and Samtredia. In 2018, he signed for HNK Gorica in the Croatian First Football League, where he made thirty-two league appearances and scored zero goals.

Honours
Torpedo Kutaisi
Georgian Cup: 2022

Samtredia
 Erovnuli Liga: 2016
 Georgian Super Cup: 2017

Dinamo Tbilisi
 Erovnuli Liga: 2013–14
 Georgian Cup:2013–14
 Georgian Super Cup: 2014

References 

Footballers from Georgia (country)
Expatriate footballers in Latvia

1992 births
Living people
FK Ventspils players
FC Locomotive Tbilisi players
FC Merani Martvili players
FC WIT Georgia players
FC Dinamo Tbilisi players
HNK Gorica players
FC Samtredia players
FC Guria Lanchkhuti players
Association football defenders